The 2022 Eastbourne International (also known as the Rothesay International Eastbourne for sponsorship reasons) was a combined men's and women's tennis tournament played on outdoor grass courts. It was the 47th edition of the event for the women and the 11th edition for the men. The tournament was classified as a WTA 500 tournament on the 2022 WTA Tour and as an ATP Tour 250 series on the 2022 ATP Tour. The tournament took place at the Devonshire Park Lawn Tennis Club in Eastbourne, United Kingdom between 19 and 25 June 2022.

Champions

Men's singles

  Taylor Fritz def.  Maxime Cressy, 6–2, 6–7(4–7), 7–6(7–4)

This is Fritz's second title of the year and third of his career.

Women's singles

  Petra Kvitová def.  Jeļena Ostapenko 6–3, 6–2

This is Kvitová's first title of the year and 29th of her career.

Men's doubles

  Nikola Mektić /  Mate Pavić def.  Matwé Middelkoop /  Luke Saville, 6–4, 6–2

Women's doubles

  Aleksandra Krunić /  Magda Linette def.  Lyudmyla Kichenok /  Jeļena Ostapenko, by walkover

Points and prize money

Point distribution

Prize money 

*per team

ATP singles main draw entrants

Seeds

 1 Rankings are as of 13 June 2022.

Other entrants
The following players received wildcards into the main draw:
  Jay Clarke 
  Jack Draper 
  Ryan Peniston 

The following players received entry from the qualifying draw:
  James Duckworth
  John Millman
  Thiago Monteiro
  Brandon Nakashima

Withdrawals
Before the tournament
  Marin Čilić → replaced by  Ugo Humbert
  Gaël Monfils → replaced by  Francisco Cerúndolo

ATP doubles main draw entrants

Seeds

1 Rankings are as of 13 June 2022.

Other entrants
The following pairs received wildcards into the doubles main draw:
  Julian Cash /  Henry Patten
  Jonny O'Mara /  Ken Skupski

Withdrawals
Before the tournament
  Simone Bolelli /  Fabio Fognini → replaced by  Maxime Cressy /  Ugo Humbert
  Wesley Koolhof /  Neal Skupski → replaced by  Matwé Middelkoop /  Luke Saville
  Tim Pütz /  Michael Venus → replaced by  Aleksandr Nedovyesov /  Aisam-ul-Haq Qureshi 
  Rajeev Ram /  Joe Salisbury → replaced by  André Göransson /  Ben McLachlan

WTA singles main draw entrants

Seeds

 1 Rankings are as of 13 June 2022.

Other entrants
The following players received wildcards into the main draw:
  Katie Boulter
  Jodie Burrage
  Harriet Dart

The following players received entry from the qualifying draw:
  Kirsten Flipkens
  Aleksandra Krunić
  Lesia Tsurenko
  Donna Vekić

The following players received entry as lucky losers:
  Rebecca Marino
  Viktoriya Tomova
  Heather Watson

Withdrawals
Before the tournament
  Danielle Collins → replaced by  Zheng Qinwen
  Leylah Fernandez → replaced by  Marta Kostyuk
  Coco Gauff → replaced by  Heather Watson
  Sofia Kenin → replaced by  Magdalena Fręch
  Anett Kontaveit → replaced by  Dayana Yastremska
  Ons Jabeur → replaced by  Viktoriya Tomova
  Jessica Pegula → replaced by  Camila Osorio
  Mayar Sherif → replaced by  Marie Bouzková
  Clara Tauson → replaced by  Panna Udvardy
  Markéta Vondroušová → replaced by  Maryna Zanevska
  Zhang Shuai → replaced by  Rebecca Marino

WTA doubles main draw entrants

Seeds

1 Rankings are as of 13 June 2022.

Other entrants
The following pairs received wildcards into the doubles main draw:
  Harriet Dart /  Heather Watson
  Ons Jabeur /  Serena Williams

Withdrawals
Before the tournament
  Desirae Krawczyk /  Demi Schuurs → replaced by  Desirae Krawczyk /  Monica Niculescu

References

External links
 Website

2022 in English tennis
Eastbourne International
2022
June 2022 sports events in the United Kingdom